Henry Asbury House (also known as the Swain Residence) is a historic house located at 211 East Waters Street in Clarkesville, Habersham County, Georgia.

Description and history 
It was built by master craftsman Rusk Church. It is a two-story central hall plan I-house.

The house was served by a Delco direct-current generator that provided it electricity 15 years before electricity became generally available. It was added to the National Register of Historic Places on August 18, 1982.

See also
National Register of Historic Places listings in Habersham County, Georgia
Charm House, former home of W.R. Asbury in Clarkesville

References

Houses completed in 1901
Houses in Habersham County, Georgia
Houses on the National Register of Historic Places in Georgia (U.S. state)
I-houses in Georgia (U.S. state)